Johann Philipp Gustav von Jolly (26 September 1809 – 24 December 1884) was a German physicist and mathematician.

Born in Mannheim as the son of merchant Louis Jolly and Marie Eleonore Jolly, he studied science in Heidelberg, Vienna and Berlin. After his studies, he was appointed professor of mathematics in Heidelberg in 1839 and in physics in 1846. He moved to Munich in 1854 where he took the position once held by Georg Simon Ohm. In 1854 he was knighted (and henceforth referred to as von Jolly).

Jolly was first and foremost an experimental physicist. He measured the acceleration due to gravity with precision weights and also worked on osmosis.

One of his students at the University of Munich was Max Planck, whom he advised in 1878 not to go into physics, saying, "in this field, almost everything is already discovered, and all that remains is to fill a few unimportant holes." Planck replied that he didn't wish to discover new things, only to understand the known fundamentals of the field. Nevertheless, Planck's work opened up the field of quantum physics.

Jolly died in Munich.

Selected works 
 Anleitung zur Differential- und Integralrechnung, 1846 – Manual of differential and integral calculus.
 Die principien der mechanik, 1852 – Principles of mechanics.
 Die Anwendung der Waage auf Probleme der Gravitation, 1878 – Application of the scale to problems of gravitation.

See also 
 Jolly balance

References 

19th-century German physicists
19th-century German mathematicians
Science teachers
Bavarian nobility
Academic staff of the Ludwig Maximilian University of Munich
Academic staff of Heidelberg University
1809 births
1884 deaths
Scientists from Mannheim
People from the Grand Duchy of Baden
Heidelberg University alumni
University of Vienna alumni
Humboldt University of Berlin alumni